Sayyid Hassan al-Musawi al-Qazwini (born October 16, 1964) is an Iraqi-American Shia Imam.
He was the resident scholar of the Islamic Center of America for eighteen years. He then founded the Islamic Institute of America in Dearborn Heights, Michigan.

Early life and education 
al-Qazwini was born in Karbala in 1964. His father is Murtadha al-Qazwini from the al-Qazwini family, and his mother is the daughter of Abd al-Amir Nasrallah, from the Nasrallah family. His family was exiled from Iraq whilst he was still young, and upon settling in Qom in 1980, he joined the seminary and began his religious education.

He completed his religious education in 1992 and managed to grasp an in-depth understanding of the fundamentals of Islamic jurisprudence and Quranic commentary. During his studies, he administered a prominent Islamic journal called an-Nibras (The eternal light).

Immigration to the United States

Los Angeles 
al-Qazwini immigrated to the United States in late 1992 along with his family, six years after his father's immigration. He spent four years in Los Angeles, where he directed the Azzahra Islamic Center, which was founded by his father, and conducted several Fiqh and various other Islamic classes. He realized the importance of disseminating the message of Islam in North America in English, especially to the youth.  While numerous scholars and religious leaders performed a good job reaching out to the Arabic speaking members of the community, the English-speaking generations needed someone who was capable of communicating with them, and so al-Qazwini devoted himself to learning and acquiring a fair grasp of the English language quickly.

Dearborn 
In early 1993, al-Qazwini was invited by the Islamic Center of America (ICA) in Dearborn; the oldest Shia mosque in the United States, as a guest speaker for the Arabic program during Ramadan, where the local community quickly found him responsive to their spiritual and religious needs. The ICA asked him to join them the following year as their guest speaker during Ramadan and then for the first ten nights of Muharram.

In 1997, al-Qazwini established residence in Dearborn, at the behest of the Islamic Center of America. al-Qazwini conducted the Friday prayer every week, delivering the first sermon in Arabic and the second in English. He also performed an English presentation during the Sunday service, usually aimed at addressing of current issues affecting the local Muslim community as well as the global community at large.

Whilst at the ICA, al-Qazwini established the sub-committee, Young Muslim Association (YMA) in 1998. The organization was aimed at educating Muslim-American youth, fostering leadership, and creating an environment in which they can actively and effectively channel their efforts in promoting Islam. In its first five years, the YMA grew to be one of the largest Muslim youth organizations in North America.

Dearborn Heights 
In 2015, al-Qazwini left the ICA and opened his own mosque, known as the Islamic Institute of America. He also established the Muslim Youth Connection (MYC) as the new youth organization.

Public appearances 
Since the September 11 attacks, al-Qazwini stepped up his efforts to act as an ambassador for Muslim Americans, speaking at numerous churches, colleges and universities, hoping to dispel what he sees as common misconceptions about them.

al-Qazwini had been invited to the White House on several occasions to represent the Shia-Muslim community.

He has met with Presidents Bill Clinton and George W. Bush, as well as with then senator Barack Obama.

He has also received invitations from the U.S. State and Defense Departments. He also made an appearance in the award-winning PBS-broadcast documentary Muhammad: Legacy of a Prophet (2002), produced by Unity Productions Foundation.

al-Qazwini met Pope Francis during the Abrahamic Faiths Initiative on January 14, 2020 in Vatican City. The initiative brought leaders from Christianity, Judaism and Islam  to work together to promote peaceful expression of faith and the renunciation of violence.

al-Qazwini endorsed Bernie Sanders in March, 2020. He addressed a Dearborn rally in Arabic on Saturday, encouraging support for Sanders.

Works
al-Qazwini authored two books:

 Meditation on Sahihain: A Critique of Sahih Al-Bukhari and Sahih Muslim
 Prophet Mohammad: The Ethical Prospect

American Crescent 
Al-Qazwini is the author of American Crescent: A Muslim Cleric on the Power of His Faith, the Struggle Against Prejudice, and the Future of Islam and America.

Rashid Khalidi of Columbia University wrote in The New York Times: 
This book is many things. It is, first, a personal chronicle of Imam Hassan Qazwini's own trajectory from Karbala, Iraq, where he was born in 1964, to exile in Kuwait and Iran, to Dearborn, Mich., where he currently heads the Islamic Center of America. Second, it is an argument for Qazwini's variety of Shia Islam, rooted in Iraq and Iran and adapted for America. Finally, it is a political statement — in fact, two of them — a plea for Muslim Americans to immerse themselves in the life of the United States while simultaneously deepening their identification as Muslims, and also for a particular outcome in Iraq, where Qazwini's father, a leading ayatollah, is Imam of the mosque of Imam Hussein in Karbala.

Personal life 
al-Qazwini is married to the daughter of Muhammad al-Shirazi. He has four sons, including Muhammad Baqer and Ahmed.

See also
 Islam in Detroit
 History of the Middle Eastern people in Metro Detroit

References

External links
 Official Website

1964 births
Living people
Iraqi emigrants to the United States
American Shia Muslims
People from Karbala
Iranian Shia clerics
Iraqi Shia Muslims
Iraqi people of Iranian descent
American people of Iranian descent